A non-monotonic logic is a formal logic whose conclusion relation is not monotonic. In other words, non-monotonic logics are devised to capture and represent defeasible inferences (cf. defeasible reasoning), i.e., a kind of inference in which reasoners draw tentative conclusions, enabling reasoners to retract their conclusion(s) based on further evidence.
Most studied formal logics have a monotonic entailment relation, meaning that adding a formula to a theory never produces a pruning of its set of conclusions. Intuitively, monotonicity indicates that learning a new piece of knowledge cannot reduce the set of what is known. A monotonic logic cannot handle various reasoning tasks such as reasoning by default (conclusions may be derived only because of lack of evidence of the contrary), abductive reasoning (conclusions are only deduced as most likely explanations), some important approaches  to reasoning about knowledge (the ignorance of a conclusion must be retracted when the conclusion becomes known), and similarly, belief revision (new  knowledge may contradict old beliefs).

Abductive reasoning

Abductive reasoning is the process of deriving a sufficient explanation of the known facts. An abductive logic should not be monotonic because the likely explanations are not necessarily correct. For example, the likely explanation for seeing wet grass is that it rained; however, this explanation has to be retracted when learning that the real cause of the grass being wet was a sprinkler. Since the old explanation (it rained) is retracted because of the addition of a piece of knowledge (a sprinkler was active), any logic that models explanations is non-monotonic.

Reasoning about knowledge

If a logic includes formulae that mean that something is not known, this logic should not be monotonic. Indeed, learning something that was previously not known leads to the removal of the formula specifying that this piece of knowledge is not known. This second change (a removal caused by an addition) violates the condition of monotonicity. A logic for reasoning about knowledge is the autoepistemic logic.

Belief revision

Belief revision is the process of changing beliefs to accommodate a new belief that might be inconsistent with the old ones. In the assumption that the new belief is correct, some of the old ones have to be retracted in order to maintain consistency. This retraction in response to an addition of a new belief makes any logic for belief revision to be non-monotonic. The belief revision approach is alternative to paraconsistent logics, which tolerate inconsistency rather than attempting to remove it.

See also

 Logic programming
 Negation as failure
 Stable model semantics
 Rational consequence relation

Notes

References

External links
 
 
 

Belief revision
Formal epistemology
Logic
Non-classical logic
Reasoning